Costa is a commune in the Haute-Corse department of France on the island of Corsica.

It is in the north of the island, about 5 km south east of Belgodère, just off the D71 corniche. The commune is built on the site of the medieval parish of Tuani.

Population

See also
Communes of the Haute-Corse department

References

Communes of Haute-Corse